In classical conditioning, the delay reduction hypothesis states that certain discriminative stimuli (DS) are more effective signals for conditioned reinforcers (CR) if they signal a decrease in time to a positive reinforcer or an increase in time to an aversive stimulus or punishment. This is often applied in chain link schedules, with the final link being the aversive stimulus or positive (unconditioned) reinforcer.

History
The delay reduction hypothesis was developed in 1969 by Edmund Fantino. As a hypothesis, delay reduction proposes that delays are aversive to organisms and that choices will be made by the organism to reduce delay.
When an organism was rewarded for an act it would repeat that action and hope for the same outcome. This would make that organism conditioned to either act or not act on the specific stimulius.

See also
 Classical conditioning
 Fear conditioning

References

Psychological theories